Torisesan "Tosan" Evbuomwan (born 16 February 2001) is a British college basketball player for Princeton Tigers of the Ivy League.

Early life
Evbuomwan was raised in Newcastle upon Tyne and is the son of a commercial pilot, Michelle, who became the first female captain to pilot a plane in Nigeria, and a gynecologist, Isaac. His mother died of breast cancer on 16 November 2012. Evbuomwan grew up playing football, rugby, cricket and track & field, and was a standout football star, being selected to Newcastle United's Youth Academy. He had a basketball hoop at his house because his father had played in Nigeria, but he did not begin playing basketball competitively until age 14. Evbuomwan attended Royal Grammar School, Newcastle upon Tyne and helped start the basketball team there with a friend. He subsequently played for the Newcastle Eagles U18 team and took part in the Deng Camp run by Luol Deng, in which his play began receiving more attention. Eagles head coach Ian MacLeod sent highlight clips of the star player to American universities, and Princeton assistant coach Brett MacConnell was impressed, and suggested to head coach Mitch Henderson to recruit him. Evbuomwan signed with Princeton in April 2019.

College career
Evbuomwan averaged 3.9 points, 1.8 rebounds, and 0.9 assists per game as a freshman at Princeton, making 19 starts. The 2020–21 season was cancelled in the Ivy League due to the COVID-19 pandemic. He practiced against the Newcastle Eagles during the pandemic and joined Great Britain's 3x3 team in Tel Aviv. 

On 4 December 2021, Evbuomwan scored a career-high 27 points in an 81–79 overtime win against Drexel. He matched his career-high of 27 points as well as seven rebounds and five steals on 4 February 2022, in an 88–83 loss to Cornell. As a junior, Evbuomwan was named unanimous Ivy League Player of the Year.

In 2023, he was named All-Ivy League, and  First Team All-District.

National team career
Evbuomwan has represented Great Britain at several international competitions. He participated in the 2018 FIBA U18 European Championship. At the 2019 FIBA U18 European Championship, he averaged 10.4 points, 7.9 rebounds, and 2.6 assists per game.

References

External links
Princeton Tigers bio

2001 births
Living people
Black British sportspeople
British expatriate basketball people in the United States
British men's basketball players
English sportspeople of Nigerian descent
People educated at the Royal Grammar School, Newcastle upon Tyne
Power forwards (basketball)
Princeton Tigers men's basketball players
Sportspeople from Newcastle upon Tyne